Wiehl is a municipality in North Rhine-Westphalia, Germany.

Wiehl may also refer to:

 Wiehl (Agger), a river in North Rhine-Westphalia, Germany
 Joe Wiehl (1910 – 1996), a professional American football player
 Lis Wiehl (born 1961), an American author and legal analyst
 Christopher Wiehl (born 1970), an American actor

See also 
 Wyhl
 Wil (disambiguation)